The Israeli Bobsled and Skeleton Team is the official bobsleigh and skeleton team of Israel.  The team is the competitive wing of Bobsled/Skeleton Israel (BSI, formerly Israeli Bobsleigh and Skeleton Federation (IBSF)), which Aaron Zeff, former National Football League player John Frank, and David Greaves founded in 2002.

The team is currently represented in bobsleigh by teams piloted by Dave Nicholls, Olympian AJ Edelman, and to-be-announced female teams and in skeleton by Georgina Cohen, Joel Seligstein, and Jared Firestone.

Bobsled and Skeleton are run under the same international federation, the IBSF (International Bobsled and Skeleton Federation, formerly known as FIBT).  Therefore, BSI ministers both the bobsled and skeleton teams.

The team qualified for the 2018 Olympic Games, in the sport of skeleton and were represented by AJ Edelman.

Bobsled team 
The Israeli National Bobsleigh Team was incorporated in 2002 and have represented Israel in the FIBT World Bobsleigh Championships on three occasions.

Bobsled alumni include Zeff, Frank. and Greaves as well as Moshe Horowitz.

Skeleton team 
BSI added Skeleton to its program in 2009.

In the 2015/16 season Israel fielded its largest team to date and held its first National Championships.  All four athletes (AJ Edelman, Joel Seligstein, Larry Sidney, and Brad Chalupski) competed through the remainder of the PyeongChang Olympic cycle. 

Israel has competed in the Skeleton World Championships in 2011, 2012, 2016, 2017 and 2019.
Skeleton alumni include Omri Geva and Aliyah Snyder.

On December 2, 2011, Chalupski earned Israel's first ever medal in Skeleton, finishing in fifth place at the Americas Cup race in Lake Placid, NY. Chalupski is also the first skeleton athlete to represent Israel in the World Cup.

In the 2017/2018 season Israel won 3 sliding medals.  Joel Seligstein took a 5th place medal at the North Americas cup race in Calgary, Canada, and Adam (AJ) Edelman took home 2 fifth place medals at the two North Americas Cup races in Lake Placid, NY to secure an Olympic berth.

Olympic Games 
Israel qualified for the 2018 Olympic Games in Pyeongchang, Korea, and was represented by national champion Adam (AJ) Edelman.

Organizational structure 
The Federation President is David Greaves, and the Secretary General is Dov 'Dubi' Shlenger.

See also
Sports in Israel

References

External links
Team Site
FIBT Microsite

National bobsleigh teams
National team
Bob